Bagverdi may refer to:

Bagverdi-ye Olya
Bagverdi-ye Sofla
Bagverdi-ye Vosta